Anthony "Fat Tony" Salerno (August 15, 1911 – July 27, 1992) was an American mobster who served as underboss and front boss of the Genovese crime family in New York City from 1981 until his conviction in 1986.

Early life
Salerno was born and raised in East Harlem, New York. In his youth, he became involved in gambling, numbers, loansharking and protection rackets for the Luciano family, which later came to be known as the Genovese family. Salerno was a member of the 116th Street Crew, headed by Michael "Trigger Mike" Coppola. Salerno climbed the family ranks by controlling a possible million-dollar-a-year numbers racket operation in Harlem and a major loansharking operation. In 1948, Coppola fled to Florida to escape murder charges, and Salerno took over the crew.

In 1959, Salerno was a secret financial backer of a heavyweight professional boxing title fight at New York's Yankee Stadium between Swedish boxer Ingemar Johansson and American boxer Floyd Patterson. No charges were filed against Salerno. Salerno divided his time between a home in Miami Beach, Florida, a  estate and horse farm in upstate Rhinebeck, New York, the Palma Boys Club in East Harlem, and his apartment in the upscale Gramercy Park section of Manhattan. Salerno served as consigliere, underboss, and acting boss of the Genovese family.

By the 1960s, Salerno controlled the largest numbers racket operation in New York, grossing up to $50 million per year. Salerno kept his headquarters at the Palma Boys Social Club in East Harlem and continued to work in these areas. The FBI accused him of heading a bookie and loan shark network that grossed $1 million annually. Salerno hired Roy Cohn as his attorney. On April 20, 1978, Salerno was sentenced to six months in federal prison for illegal gambling and tax evasion charges. In early 1981, after his release from prison, Salerno suffered a mild stroke and retreated to his Rhinebeck estate to recuperate. At the time of his stroke, Salerno was Genovese underboss.

Genovese front boss and prison
After Salerno's recovery from his stroke and the March 31, 1981, death of Genovese front boss Frank Tieri, Salerno succeeded him. Although law enforcement at the time thought that Salerno was the boss of the Genovese family, it was an open secret in New York Mafia circles that Salerno was merely a front man for the real boss, Vincent "the Chin" Gigante. For instance, Alphonse "Little Al" D'Arco, who later became acting boss of the Lucchese crime family before turning informer, told investigators that when he became a Lucchese made man in 1982, he was told that Gigante was the boss of the Genovese family. Ever since the death of boss Vito Genovese in 1969, the real family leader had been Philip "Benny Squint" Lombardo. Over the years, Lombardo used several front bosses to hide his real status from law enforcement, a practice continued when Gigante took over the family upon Lombardo's retirement in 1981.

On February 25, 1985, Salerno and eight other New York bosses on the "Mafia Commission" were indicted in the Mafia Commission Trial. In October 1986, Fortune Magazine named the 75-year-old Salerno as America's top gangster in power, wealth and influence. For that reason, he was nominally the lead defendant in the trial. Many observers disputed Salerno's top ranking, claiming that law enforcement greatly exaggerated Salerno's importance to bring attention to their legal case against him. Salerno's bail request was denied and his attorneys appealed the decision all the way to the United States Supreme Court. However, in United States v. Salerno the Supreme Court ruled that he could be held without bail because of his potential danger to the community. Along with the other defendants of the trial, Salerno pleaded not guilty on July 1, 1985. On November 19, 1986, Salerno was convicted on RICO charges. On January 13, 1987, he was sentenced, along with six other defendants, to 100 years in prison without parole and fined $240,000.

While awaiting the Mafia Commission trial, Salerno was indicted in a separate trial on March 21, 1986, in a second federal racketeering indictment, which accused Salerno of having hidden controlling interests in S & A Concrete Co. and Transit-Mix Concrete Corp. in the construction of Mount Sinai School of Medicine, Memorial Sloan-Kettering Cancer Center, and the Trump Tower. Salerno was also accused of illegally aiding the election of Roy Lee Williams to the national presidency of the Teamsters Union. Salerno pleaded not guilty on all charges. In October 1988, he was convicted and sentenced to 70 years in prison, including a $376,000 fine, and ordered to forfeit half of the racketeering proceeds (estimated to be $30 million).

In 1986, shortly after Salerno's conviction in the Commission Trial, Salerno's longtime right-hand man, Vincent "The Fish" Cafaro, turned informant, and told the FBI that Salerno had never been the real boss of the Genoveses, but was merely a front for Gigante. Cafaro also revealed that the Genovese family had been keeping up this ruse since 1969. An FBI bug had captured a conversation in which Salerno and capo Matthew "Matty the Horse" Ianniello were reviewing a list of prospective candidates to be made in another family. Frustrated that the nicknames of the wannabes hadn't been included, Salerno shrugged and said, "I'll leave this up to the boss"–a clear sign that he was not the real leader of the family. However, according to New York Times organized crime reporter Selwyn Raab, even though prosecutors erred in billing Salerno as the Genovese boss, this mistake would not have jeopardized Salerno's conviction at the Commission Trial or his 100-year sentence. In his book, Five Families, Raab noted that Salerno had been tried and convicted for specific criminal acts, not for being a boss.

Death
After his conviction and imprisonment, Salerno's health deteriorated due to his diabetes and suspected prostate cancer. On July 27, 1992, Anthony Salerno died at the Medical Center for Federal Prisoners in Springfield, Missouri.

Salerno was buried at Saint Raymond's Cemetery in the Throggs Neck section of the Bronx in New York City.

In popular culture
Salerno is portrayed by Paul Sorvino in the film Kill the Irishman (2011) and Domenick Lombardozzi in the film The Irishman (2019).

References

Raab, Selwyn. Five Families: The Rise, Decline, and Resurgence of America's Most Powerful Mafia Empires. New York: St. Martin's Press 2005.

External links
 New York Times "Teamsters and Mobster Linked" from July 29, 1988
 FBI file on Anthony Salerno

1911 births
1992 deaths
American gangsters of Italian descent
American people convicted of tax crimes
American people who died in prison custody
Genovese crime family
Numbers game
People convicted of racketeering
Prisoners who died in United States federal government detention
Burials at Saint Raymond's Cemetery (Bronx)
People from East Harlem
People from Gramercy Park
Consiglieri